Lepidoblennius is a genus of triplefins in the family Tripterygiidae. Both species occur in Australia.

Species
There are currently two species in the genus Lepidoblennius:

 Eastern jumping blenny, Lepidoblennius haplodactylus Steindachner, 1867
 Western jumping blenny, Lepidoblennius marmoratus (W.J. Macleay, 1878)

References

 
Tripterygiidae